Sonya Thomas  (born Lee Sun-kyung on July 26, 1967), also known by her nickname The Black Widow, and "The Leader of the Four Horsemen of the Esophagus", is a South Korean-born American competitive eater from Alexandria, Virginia. Thomas joined the International Federation of Competitive Eating in 2003 and quickly rose to the top of the ranks, beating competitive eaters such as Eric Booker.

Her nickname "The Black Widow" refers to her ability to regularly defeat men four to five times her size. While the size of her stomach is only slightly larger than normal, her skinny build is perhaps her biggest advantage, allowing her stomach to expand more readily since it is not surrounded by the ring of fat common in other heavy eaters. She holds records in over 25 eating competitions, and in December 2008, she set the world record for fruit-cake eaten in 10 minutes.

On July 4, 2005, she ate 37 hot dogs in 12 minutes at Nathan's Hot Dog Eating Contest, setting a then-record for American competitors (which was also the female record). On August 8, 2005, she consumed 35 bratwursts in 10 minutes, beating the previous 10-minute record of 19.5 bratwursts, although her record was beaten in 2006 by Takeru Kobayashi.

On July 4, 2011, Thomas became the first champion of Nathan's Hot Dog Eating Contest for Women. Eating 40 hot dogs in 10 minutes, Thomas earned the inaugural pink Pepto Bismol Belt and won $10,000. She defended and held on to that title the following year eating 46 hot dogs. On July 4, 2013, she again defended her title by eating 36 hot dogs, just beating out Juliet Lee who ate 36 hot dogs.

Competition

Champion
Thomas's first major victory that put her on the competitive eating map was in the 2004 Wing Bowl, where she became the first woman to win a Wing Bowl. Her tally of 32 hot dogs in the 2004 Nathan's Hot Dog contest was the most ever eaten by a male or female American competitor at the time. The only eaters besides Kobayashi to defeat Thomas between the 2004 and 2005 Nathan's contests were Bill "El Wingador" Simmons in the 2005 Wing Bowl, and Dale Boone, who cooled overheated baked beans in order to win an eating contest.

On July 4, 2011, Thomas became the first champion of Nathan's Hot Dog Eating Contest for Women. Eating 40 hot dogs in 10 minutes, Thomas earned the inaugural Pink Belt and won $10,000.

Thomas had won 1st place in the National Buffalo Wing Festival US chicken wing eating championship five-years straight from 2007–2011. On September 4, 2011, she attained the United States Chicken Wing Eating Championship in Buffalo, New York by eating 183 chicken wings in 12 minutes. On September 2, 2012 Joey Chestnut consumed 191 wings (7.61 pounds) in 12 minutes to take competitive-eating trophy from the five-year champion Sonya Thomas.

Challenge and response
When Thomas undertook a challenging schedule of three contests in three cities on Labor Day weekend 2005, she had not lost a contest to anyone besides Kobayashi since the Wing Bowl in early February. Several last-minute victories foreshadowed that her streak would not last forever. At the Buffalo Wing Festival in Buffalo, NY, Ms. Thomas lost to Eric "Badlands" Booker in a chicken wing contest and then lost a waffle eating contest in Atlanta the next day to the fast-rising rookie Joey Chestnut, giving her a two event losing streak to replace her winning streak. Thomas' waffle defeat was avenged on Labor Day, however, when she out-ate Chestnut in the Chattanooga, TN Krystal Square Off qualifier. Thomas ate 57 Krystal Burgers to Chestnut's 56.

Before the GoldenPalace.com turkey eating contest in New York City Thanksgiving Eve, Thomas had gone three months without winning a non-qualifying contest, although she did have two impressive victories in qualifiers during that span. It appeared that Chestnut would soon claim the title of the leading American eater from Thomas. The civil engineering student from San Jose State had defeated Thomas in three of their last four match-ups and was the first eater to lead Kobayashi for the majority of a contest at the Krystal Square Off in Chattanooga the previous week. Although Thomas came in third, the silver lining was her domination of Kobayashi on a pound for pound basis: Thomas 56 burgers / 100 lb. = 0.56, Kobayashi 67 burgers / 170 lb. = 0.39.

At the turkey contest, Thomas was able to dramatically reverse her recent slump and defeat Chestnut without last second heroics, which she had not been able to do since Nathan's hot dog contest on July 4. Thomas' momentum continued the following week at a meatball contest in Atlantic City. Her total of 10 lb. 3 oz. beat Chestnut by two pounds and almost doubled her total from the previous year's meatball contest. Thomas' continued improvement, along with Chestnut's rapid ascent, gave Kobayashi more to worry about in 2006 than at any previous time in his dominant career.

On August 13, 2006, Thomas won her Asian debut competition in Hong Kong while setting her 28th eating record, by consuming 17 Chinese-style lotus seed buns in 12 minutes.

In the media
She was featured in a MasterCard Paypass commercial. By accident, she meets Takeru Kobayashi, a male competitor, in a convenience store. Their eyes flash, and they begin a hot dog eating duel, which they pay for using the Paypass card.

Future

In 2005, Thomas earned more than $50,000 in prize money and made extensive media appearances. She is unsure how long she will continue eating competitively, but she hopes to own a fast-food franchise one day. She would like to compete in Japanese eating contests, which pay more but last longer than she prefers. She intends to continue eating competitively until she either loses her desire, or falls out of the ranks of the elite eaters.

Training and competition notes

 She exercises by walking on an inclined treadmill for two hours, five times per week. 
 She regularly visits all-you-can-eat buffets at restaurants.
 The night before a contest, she fasts all night in order to put an edge on her appetite.
 Thomas exercises up to two hours a day on an incline treadmill, and has maintained her weight since she started competing in 2003, down from 135 pounds when she worked as a typist in Korea. Her lowest weight has been 99 lb. at Wing Bowl XII in 2004.
 She only eats one very large meal a day, which takes several hours for her to complete. This meal includes green vegetables and fresh fruit. A typical post-work meal for her would be three large orders of fries, a chicken Whopper, 20 chicken tenders, and two 32-ounce diet soft drinks.
 She does not practice eating at speed for more than a two-minute period.
 Her favorite foods to eat at competitions are hard-boiled eggs, oysters and chicken wings.
 She claims to have had remaining stomach capacity after all her contests, except after eating the eight pound Barrick burger, which took her 48 minutes to finish. She ate enough oysters to set the untimed record for oyster eating after the 2005 oyster competition was officially over.
 She had difficulty eating a hot dog in less than a minute when she first started training for her first contest, the 2003 Nathan's qualifier. After practicing, she was able to consume 18 hot dogs in 12 minutes.
 She out-ate Randy Thomas, a pro football player noted for his appetite, consuming 6.5 pounds of shrimp in 10 minutes to his 1.5 pounds.

Records
 Asparagus
 5.75 pounds of tempura deep fried asparagus spears in 10 minutes
 Cheesecakes
 11 pounds of Downtown Atlantic cheesecake in 9 minutes
 Chicken nuggets
 80 chicken nuggets in 5 minutes
 Chicken wings
 183 chicken wings in 12 minutes (2011 record)
Chili
 1.125 Gallons of Chili in 6 minutes
 Crabcakes
 46 three ounce crabcakes in 10 minutes
 Eggs
 65 hard boiled eggs in 6 minutes and 40 seconds
 Fruitcakes
 4 pounds, 14 ounces of Wegman's Fruitcake in 10 minutes
 Gyoza
 206 gyoza in 10 minutes
 Hamburgers
 7 burgers ( pound "Thickburgers") in 10 minutes
 Jambalaya
 9 pounds of crawfish jambalaya in 10 minutes
 Lobster
 44 lobsters totaling 11.3 pounds of lobster meat in 12 minutes
 MoonPies
 38 Moonpies in 8 minutes
 Oysters
 46 dozen Acme Oysters in 10 minutes(2005)
 29 dozen Acme Oysters in 8 minutes (2009)-Louisiana oyster season produced much larger oysters in 2009 explaining the slower pace -reclaimed the World Oyster Eating title
 Pizza
 6 extra large Bocce pizza slices in 15 minutes
 Pulled pork
 23 pulled pork sandwiches in 10 minutes
 Tacos
 43 soft tacos in 11 minutes
 Tater tots
 250 tater tots in 5 minutes
 Turducken
 7 pounds Turducken.com Thanksgiving Dinner in 12 minutes

Nathan's Famous Hot Dog Eating Contest results

National Buffalo Wing Festival competition wins

See also
 List of competitive eaters

References

External links 
 Official website
 International Federation of Competitive Eating (IFOCE) profile

1967 births
Living people
South Korean emigrants to the United States
American competitive eaters
American sportswomen
American sportspeople of Korean descent
Sportspeople from North Jeolla Province
21st-century American women